Lauda Air Luftfahrt GmbH, branded as Lauda Air, was an Austrian airline headquartered at Vienna International Airport in Schwechat.  It was owned by Niki Lauda (1949–2019) during much of its existence, later becoming a charter airline subsidiary for leisure operations of Austrian Airlines. On 6 April 2013, Lauda Air ceased to exist and was replaced by Austrian myHoliday, a new brand name that is used for flights and leisure offers provided by Austrian Airlines.

History

Development as an independent airline
Lauda Air was established in April 1979 by former Formula One world motor racing champion Niki Lauda and started operations in 1985, initially operating as a charter and air taxi service.  One of the first jetliner types used by Lauda Air was the British Aircraft Corporation BAC One-Eleven series 500, with these aircraft being leased from the Romanian airline TAROM. It opened its headquarters in the Lauda Air Building in Schwechat, Austria.  Scheduled operations were licensed and initiated in 1987, and in 1990 licences for international flights were obtained.  

In 1989 Lauda started its first long-haul flights from Vienna to Sydney and Melbourne via Bangkok.  In the 1990s, it started to fly its Sydney and Melbourne flights via Kuala Lumpur and Bali.  Daily flights to Dubai, Cuba, and Miami via Munich followed.

Merger with Austrian Airlines
Lauda Air became a wholly owned subsidiary of Austrian Airlines in December 2000 and employed thirty-five people as of March 2007.  In 2005 the flight operation merged with Austrian Airlines, and the label "Lauda Air" operated charter flights within the Austrian Airlines Group.

At an AAG board meeting in November 2006, plans were approved to retire the Airbus wide-bodied fleet by mid-2007 and to operate with just a Boeing 767 and Boeing 777 fleet.  As a result of subsequent fleet cuts, Austrian Airlines suspended some long-haul services and Lauda Air withdrew from the long-haul charter market over the next year.  This led to a refocus on the short/medium-haul market and led to the addition of a 737-800 to take over most of the charter routes. Lauda Air also had an Italian subsidiary, Lauda Air S.p.A., which ended its operations in 2007.

Lauda Air was officially merged into Austrian Airlines on 1 July 2012. All aircraft within the group were transferred to Austrian Airlines on 1 July 2012, to be able to take advantage of Austrian Airlines structure. There are still Lauda liverys in use to this day.

The brand was retired at the start of the summer flight schedule on 31 March 2013, and was replaced by "Austrian myHoliday". It is no longer an airline but a branding that is used to sell Austrian Airlines' own leisure offers.

Destinations 

Austrian Airlines regularly served, among others, the following destinations under the Lauda Air brand until March 2013:

Former destinations 
The following destinations were served by Lauda Air as an independent airline prior to their merger into Austrian Airlines:

Fleet

Historic fleet 
Lauda Air's historic fleet included the following aircraft during its existence:

Lauda Air Executive
Lauda Air also operated a fleet of three small jets, a Cessna Citation II (9 seats), a Bombardier Lear 60 (7 seats), and a Dassault Falcon 20 (12 seats). These were available for private charter flights.

Incidents and accidents 
Lauda Air suffered one fatal accident during its existence:
 On 26 May 1991, Lauda Air Flight 004, operated by a Boeing 767-300ER registered as OE-LAV, named after Wolfgang Amadeus Mozart, crashed in Thailand shortly after take-off from Don Mueang International Airport in Bangkok, due to the uncommanded deployment of one of its thrust reversers. This accident resulted in the deaths of all 223 passengers and crew.

References

External links 

  (Archive)

 
Defunct airlines of Austria
Airlines established in 1979
Airlines disestablished in 2013
2013 disestablishments in Austria
Former Star Alliance affiliate members
Austrian companies established in 1979